Mayhew is a surname of English, Norman French or biblical origins. It is also sometimes a given name. Notable people with the name include:

Surname

People
 Augustus Mayhew (1826–1875), English journalist and author
 Christopher Mayhew (1915–1997), British politician
 Cicely Mayhew (1924–2016), British diplomat
 Clarence W. W. Mayhew (1906–1994), American architect
 David R. Mayhew (born 1937), American political scientist
 David Mayhew (racing driver) (born 1982), American racing driver
 Diane Youdale Mayhew (born 1970), English television personality
 Donna Mayhew (born 1960), American javelin thrower
 Edward Mayhew (1569–1625), English Benedictine
 Experience Mayhew (1673–1758), New England missionary
 Gerry Mayhew (born 1969), Royal Air Force senior officer
 Helen Mayhew, British radio presenter and producer
 Henry Mayhew (1812–1887), English social researcher and reforming journalist
 Horace Mayhew (1845–1926), British mining engineer
 Horace Mayhew (journalist) (1816–1872), English journalist
 John Mayhew (disambiguation), various people
 Jonathan Mayhew (1720–1766), American clergyman
 Judith Mayhew Jonas (born 1950), New Zealand-born British lawyer and academic
 Lauren Mayhew (born 1985), American singer and actress
 Matthew Mayhew (1648–1710), Governor and Chief Magistrate of Martha's Vineyard
 Martin Mayhew (born 1965), American football player and executive
 Nell Brooker Mayhew (1875–1940), American artist
 Patrick Mayhew (1929–2016), British barrister and politician
 Peter Mayhew (1944–2019), English-born American actor
 Robert Mayhew (1880–1971), Canadian politician and diplomat
 Sara Mayhew (born 1984), Canadian writer and graphic artist
 Thomas Mayhew (1593–1682), Governor of Massachusetts who established the first English settlement of Martha's Vineyard in 1642
 Wilbur Waldo Mayhew (1920-2014), American zoologist

Fictional characters
 Alexander Mayhew, in the video game 007: Nightfire
 Benjamin Mayhew IX and Michael Mayhew (Honorverse), in David Weber's science fiction Honorverse series
 Richard Mayhew in Neil Gaiman's Neverwhere
Brandon "Badger" Mayhew in Breaking Bad and El Camino

Given name
 Mayhew Beckwith (1798–1871), merchant and politician in Nova Scotia (in present-day Canada)
 Mayhew Folger (1774–1828), American whaler who rediscovered the Pitcairn Islands
 Mayhew Foster (1911–2011), American soldier

References

English-language surnames